Hestina nama, the Circe, is a species of nymphalid butterfly found in South Asia.

See also
 List of butterflies of India (Nymphalidae)

References

Apaturinae
Fauna of Pakistan
Butterflies of Asia
Butterflies described in 1850